was a Japanese composer.

Narita was born in Yonaizawa, Kitaakita District, Akita.

Works, editions and recordings
Songs
 Kanariya (かなりや "Canary") 1918
 Akai Tori Kotori (赤い鳥小鳥 "Red bird, small bird"); lyrics by Hakushū Kitahara
 Hamabe no uta (浜辺の歌 "Song of the beach"); lyrics by Kokei Hayashi. Recording Kazumichi Ohno (tenor), Kyosuke Kobayashi (piano); later recorded by Jean-Pierre Rampal (flute), Ensemble Lunaire. Japanese Folk Melodies transcribed by Akio Yashiro. CBS Records, 1978.
 Akita Prefectural Anthem (秋田県民歌 "Song of Akita Prefecture "); lyrics by Masatsugu Kurata.

References

1893 births
1945 deaths
20th-century Japanese composers
20th-century Japanese male musicians
Japanese male composers
Musicians from Akita Prefecture